Shirley Cawley (born 26 April 1932) is a former British athlete who won the bronze medal in the long jump at the 1952 Summer Olympics held in Helsinki, Finland. She was born in Croydon and ran for the Croydon Harriers.

She married John R. Berry in 1958.

References

1932 births
Living people
English female long jumpers
Olympic bronze medallists for Great Britain
Athletes (track and field) at the 1952 Summer Olympics
Olympic athletes of Great Britain
Medalists at the 1952 Summer Olympics
Olympic bronze medalists in athletics (track and field)